Gyaca (རྒྱ་ཚ་), also known as Drumpa, is a township in the Tibet Autonomous Region of China, approximately  from Lhasa. It is the seat of Gyaca County in the Shannan Prefecture and lies on a bend in the Brahmaputra River. It contains the Dakpo Tratsang Monastery and government offices for Gyaca County.

See also
List of towns and villages in Tibet

Populated places in Shannan, Tibet
Gyaca County